Vadim Nikolayevich Glovatsky (1 January 1970 – 5 January 2015) was a Soviet and later Kazakhstani ice hockey defender. He played for several Soviet and Russian clubs between 1985–2005, and represented Kazakhstan at the 1998 Winter Olympics, placing fifth.

Glovatsky won the Russian title with Metallurg Magnitogorsk in 1999 and 2001, placing second in 1998 and third in 2000; he won the European Hockey League title in 1999 and 2000 and the Russian Cup in 1998 with the same club. After retiring from competitions he worked as an assistant coach of Chelyabinsk Polar Bears.

Career statistics

Regular season and playoffs

International

References

1970 births
2015 deaths
HC Sibir Novosibirsk players
HC Spartak Moscow players
Ice hockey players at the 1998 Winter Olympics
Kazakhstani ice hockey defencemen
Metallurg Magnitogorsk players
Olympic ice hockey players of Kazakhstan
People from Temirtau
Severstal Cherepovets players
Soviet ice hockey defencemen
Traktor Chelyabinsk players